Pierre Crinon (born 2 August 1995) is a French ice hockey player who currently plays professionally for Brûleurs de Loups of the Ligue Magnus.

He represented France at the 2019 IIHF World Championship.

Career statistics

Regular season and playoffs

International

References

External links

1995 births
Living people
Diables Rouges de Briançon players
Ducs de Dijon players
French expatriate ice hockey people
French expatriate sportspeople in the United States
French ice hockey defencemen
Rapaces de Gap players
Sioux City Musketeers players
Sportspeople from Reims
HK Dukla Trenčín players
Brûleurs de Loups players
French expatriate sportspeople in Slovakia
Expatriate ice hockey players in the United  States
Expatriate ice hockey players in Slovakia